Jean Grieder (28 March 1874 – 1941) was a Swiss businessman, an asset and liability manager. He held high honorary positions in his hometown and was founder member of FC Basel.

Football career
Grieder was member of the Basel rowing club and during a visit to England he had seen the new football game. After a newspaper advert, there was a meeting on 15 November 1893 and the Fussball Club Basel was founded. Grieder attended the founders meeting and joined the team that evening. At the club’s second meeting Roland Geldner was elected as the club's first chairman and Grieder as the club's secretary .

Grieder joined the team’s trainings. Team mate Charles Volderauer, as businessman, had good connections and used them from the very beginning. As early as June 1894, he organised the journey to visit Strassburger FV. Grieder was with the group that travelled and played in the match, which ended with a 0–8 defeat.

He stayed with the club as active footballed just one year and during this time Grieder played only that one game for Basel. Grieder held high honorary positions in his hometown, including many functions with the rowing club.

Footnotes

Sources 
 Rotblau: Jahrbuch Saison 2017/2018. Publisher: FC Basel Marketing AG. 
 Die ersten 125 Jahre. Publisher: Josef Zindel im Friedrich Reinhardt Verlag, Basel. 
 Verein "Basler Fussballarchiv" Homepage

References 

FC Basel players
Swiss men's footballers
Association football midfielders
FC Basel non-playing staff
1874 births
1941 deaths